Frank John Glieber (April 5, 1934 – May 1, 1985) was an American sportscaster.

Early life and career
Born and raised in Milwaukee, Wisconsin, Glieber was the oldest child of immigrants—John, a native of Austria, and Mary, a native of Germany. He attended Northwestern University, graduating with a bachelor's degree in 1956, then moved to the Dallas area and began his career broadcasting local sports events on area radio stations in the 1950s. In 1965, he moved to Cleveland to become sports director at WJW-TV. In 1966 and 1967, he also handled the play-by-play for the CBS broadcasts of the Cleveland Browns' NFL games, with Warren Lahr doing the color commentary.

In 1968, he returned to Dallas. As sports director of KRLD radio, Glieber called play-by-play of local college basketball and minor league baseball teams and served as a color commentator on Dallas Cowboys broadcasts. From 1978–80, he was a television announcer for the Texas Rangers. Glieber was named Texas Sportscaster of the Year seven times.

CBS Sports
In 1963, Glieber began a long career with CBS television. Over the next two decades he would broadcast a variety of events for the network including NFL football, NBA and NCAA basketball, professional bowling, tennis, NASL soccer, and golf (including the Masters Tournament each spring). Glieber continued to broadcast local Dallas area sports events during his time at CBS, working as many as sixteen hours a day. He was also a commentator for the World Series of Poker.

Death
At age 51 in 1985, Glieber collapsed and died of an apparent heart attack while jogging at the Ken Cooper Aerobics Center in Dallas. He was survived by his fourth wife, Kathy, and his five children, Jon, Lynne, Robin, Craig, and Mitchell.

Tom Brookshier, who previously served as Pat Summerall's color commentator prior to John Madden, replaced Glieber in the NFL on CBS broadcast booth. Glieber's last assignment for CBS Sports was Game 1 of the 1985 NBA Playoff series between Portland Trail Blazers and Los Angeles Lakers. Glieber called the game alongside James Brown. Before his death, Glieber was also assigned to call Game 4 of the Portland–Los Angeles series, but was ultimately replaced by Verne Lundquist.

References

External links
Handbook of Texas Online: GLIEBER, FRANK

1934 births
1985 deaths
American Basketball Association announcers
American television sports announcers
Bowling broadcasters
Cleveland Browns announcers
College basketball announcers in the United States
College football announcers
Dallas Cowboys announcers
Golf writers and broadcasters
Major League Baseball broadcasters
Minor League Baseball broadcasters
National Basketball Association broadcasters
National Football League announcers
North American Soccer League (1968–1984) commentators
Northwestern University alumni
People from Dallas
People from Milwaukee
Sports in Dallas
Tennis commentators
Texas Rangers (baseball) announcers
Women's college basketball announcers in the United States